Joseph Kabwe (born August 8, 1980 in Bulawayo) is a Zimbabwean footballer who last played for Carolina RailHawks in the USSF Division 2 Professional League.

Career

College and Amateur
Kabwe began his collegiate career at Lindsey Wilson College in the NAIA where he was a 2003 second team All American.  In 2004, he transferred to Coastal Carolina University in the NCAA Division I. In 2003, he spent the collegiate off seasons with the Des Moines Menace in the USL Premier Development League.  In 2004 and 2005, he played for the Michigan Bucks.

Professional
In 2006, Kabwe turned professional and moved to the Charlotte Eagles in the USL Second Division.  In March 2009, he signed with the Carolina RailHawks in the USL First Division.

Kabwe was not listed on the 2011 roster for Carolina released April 4, 2011.

International
Kabwe has played for the Zimbabwe U-20 and U-23 national teams in 2001 and 2003.

References

External links
 Carolina RailHawks bio
 Coastal Carolina bio

1980 births
Living people
North Carolina FC players
Charlotte Eagles players
Des Moines Menace players
Flint City Bucks players
USL League Two players
USL First Division players
USL Second Division players
Richmond Kickers players
Zimbabwean footballers
USSF Division 2 Professional League players
USL Championship players
Coastal Carolina Chanticleers men's soccer players
Lindsey Wilson Blue Raiders men's soccer players
Sportspeople from Bulawayo
Association football forwards
Association football midfielders